QRZ.com is an amateur radio website listing almost every callsign in the world. Founded by Fred L. Lloyd in 1992, a considerable amount of effort was devoted to connecting with the FCC database to create a CD-ROM with all call signs issued in the United States. The CD-ROM is carried on board the International Space Station and was also aboard the Russian Mir space station. It is one of the most recognized websites for amateur radio enthusiasts. Information is pulled directly from the FCC database and from on-line databases of other nations, when available. Registered users can edit their data for accuracy and currency and many list additional information about their station, antennas and other life interests.

Etymology
QRZ, the name of the web site, is the "Q" amateur radio code for "Who is calling me?" and corresponds to the site's purpose of assisting amateur radio operators with the lookup of ham radio call signs from every country in the world.

Features 
The website features a personal web page where registered amateur radio operators can post pictures of their ham radio shack, tell cool facts about themselves, post their email and postal addresses for other radio amateurs to send their QSL cards and list any equipment they would like to sell. The web site also features on-line discussion forums and is the go-to place to find local amateur radio clubs.

References

External links
 

Amateur radio
Online databases